Shogakukan published Human Crossing in 27 bound volumes between October 1, 1981, and March 1, 1991. The series was republished into 19 bound volumes between November 17, 1994, and June 15, 1996.

Volume list

References

Human Crossing